Martin Štrba (born 26 August 1961) is a Slovak cinematographer. He contributed to more than fifty films since 1991 including The Garden and Autumn Spring.

References

External links 

1961 births
Living people
Slovak cinematographers
Sun in a Net Awards winners